Suze may refer to:

 Suze (river), a tributary of the Aar river in Switzerland
 Suze, Drôme, a commune of France in the Drôme department
 Suze (drink), a French brand of bitters
 "Suze (The Cough Song)", a 1963 recording by Bob Dylan

People with the given name
 Suze DeMarchi (born 1964), Australian singer/songwriter
 Suze Groeneweg (1875–1940), Dutch politician
 Suze Orman (born 1951), American financial advisor, author, motivational speaker, and television host
 Suze Randall (born 1946), English photographer and model
 Suze Rotolo (1943–2011), American artist

See also
 Suzie (disambiguation)
 Suzy (disambiguation)
 Suzanne (disambiguation)
 Susanna (disambiguation)
 Susan